Soyosan is a mountain in Gyeonggi-do, South Korea. Its area extends across the cities of Pocheon and Dongducheon. The mountain is home to two Buddhist shrines commemorating Silla priests Wonhyo and Uisang, and a small temple called Jaja Hermitage. The mountain is famous for its small waterfalls and spring wells and is a popular hiking route.

See also
 List of mountains in Korea

Notes

References
 

Mountains of South Korea
Mountains of Gyeonggi Province